The 2014–15 West Coast Conference men's basketball season will begin with practices in October 2014 and end with the 2015 West Coast Conference men's basketball tournament at the Orleans Arena March 6–10, 2015 in Paradise, Nevada. The regular season will begin in November, with the conference schedule starting at the end of December.

This will be the 30th season for WCC men's basketball, which began in the 1985–86 season when the league was known as the West Coast Athletic Conference (WCAC). It will also be the 26th season under the West Coast Conference name (the conference began as the California Basketball Association in 1952, became the WCAC in 1956, and dropped the word "Athletic" in 1989).

Pre-season
 Pre-season media day will take place in September or October at the Time Warner Cable SportsNet and Time Warner Cable Deportes Studios. Video interviews will be hosted on the WCC's streaming video outlet, TheW.tv, beginning at 11:30 AM PDT. Jeff Lampe of WCC Live interviewed each coach and got a preview of their respective season. The regional television schedule announcement, the Pre-season Conference team, and the pre-season coaches rankings were some of the additional events that took place.

2014–15 West Coast Men's Basketball Media Poll
The Pre-season poll will be announced at the conferences media day in September or October 2014.
 
Rank, School (first-place votes), Points
1. Gonzaga (9), 81
2. BYU (1), 69
3. St. Mary's, 62
4. San Francisco, 59
5. San Diego, 47
6. Portland, 45
7. Pepperdine, 29
7. Santa Clara, 29
9. Loyola Marymount, 19
10. Pacific, 10

2014–15 West Coast Men's Preseason All-West Conference Team
Player, School, Yr., Pos.
Jared Brownridge, Santa Clara, So., G
Kyle Collinsworth, BYU, Jr., G
Stacy Davis, Pepperdine, Jr., F
Johnny Dee, San Diego, Sr., G
Tyler Haws, BYU, Sr., G
Przemek Karnowski, Gonzaga, Jr., C
Kevin Pangos, Gonzaga, Sr., G
Kruize Pinkins, San Francisco, Sr., F
Thomas van der Mars, Portland, Sr., C
Brad Waldow, Saint Mary's, Sr., C

Rankings
The AP Poll does not do a post-season rankings. As a result, their last rankings are Week 19. The Coaches Poll does a post-season poll and the end of the NCAA Tournament.

Non-Conference games
Gonzaga defeated #22 SMU 72—56.

Conference games

Composite Matrix
This table summarizes the head-to-head results between teams in conference play. (x) indicates games remaining this season.

Conference tournament

  March 5–10, 2015– West Coast Conference Basketball Tournament, Orleans Arena, Paradise, Nevada.

Head coaches
Dave Rose, BYU
Mark Few, Gonzaga
Max Good, Loyola Marymount
Ron Verlin, Pacific
Marty Wilson, Pepperdine
Eric Reveno, Portland
Randy Bennett, Saint Mary's
Bill Grier, San Diego
Rex Walters, San Francisco
Kerry Keating, Santa Clara

Postseason

NCAA tournament

NIT

CBI

CiT

Awards and honors

WCC Player-of-the-Week
The WCC player of the week awards are given each Monday once the season begins.

Nov. 17- Brandon Clark, G, Santa Clara
 Dec. 1- Kevin Pangos, G, Gonzaga
 Dec. 15- Kyle Wiltjer, F, Gonzaga
 Dec. 30- Kyle Collinsworth, G, BYU
 Jan. 12- Stacy Davis, F, Pepperdine
 Jan. 26- Brandon Clark, G, Santa Clara
 Feb. 9- Kyle Collinsworth, G, BYU
 Feb. 23- Kyle Wiltjer, F, Gonzaga
Nov. 24- Brad Waldow, F, Saint Mary's
 Dec. 8- Kyle Collinsworth, G, BYU
 Dec. 22- Dulani Robinson, G, Pacific
 Jan. 5- Przemek Karnowski, C, Gonzaga
 Jan. 19- Brad Waldow, F, Saint Mary's
 Feb. 2- Domantas Sabonis, F, Gonzaga
 Feb. 16- Kyle Wiltjer, F, Gonzaga
 Mar. 2- Kyle Collinsworth, G, BYU

College Madnesss West Coast Player of the Week

College Madness WCC player of the Week Awards will be given every Sunday once the season begins.

Nov. 16- Brandon Clark, G, Santa Clara
 Nov. 30- Kyle Wiltjer, F, Gonzaga 
 Dec. 14- Aaron Bright, G, Saint Mary's
 Dec. 28- Brad Waldow, F, Saint Mary's
 Jan. 11- Stacy Davis, F, Pepperdine
 Jan. 25- Brandon Clark, G, Santa Clara
 Feb. 8- Kyle Collinsworth, G, BYU
 Feb. 22- Kyle Wiltjer, F, Gonzaga
Nov. 23- Brad Waldow, F, Saint Mary's
 Dec. 7- Kyle Collinsworth, G, BYU
 Dec. 21- T.J. Wallace, G, Pacific
 Jan. 4- Kyle Collinsworth, G, BYU 
 Jan. 18- Brad Waldow, F, Saint Mary's
 Feb. 1- Johnny Dee, G, San Diego
 Feb. 15- Kyle Collinsworth, G, BYU
 Mar. 1- Kyle Collinsworth, G, BYU

National Player of the Week Awards
To Be Determined after the season begins.

All-Americans

First-Team All-Conference
The voting body for all conference awards is league coaches and will take place at the end of the season.

Second-Team All-Conference

Honorable Mention

All-Freshman

See also
2014-15 NCAA Division I men's basketball season
West Coast Conference men's basketball tournament
2014–15 West Coast Conference women's basketball season
West Coast Conference women's basketball tournament
2015 West Coast Conference women's basketball tournament

References